Manilal Bhagwanji Desai (1939-1966) was a Gujarati poet from India.

Life
He was born in Gorgam (now in Valsad district, Gujarat) on 19 July 1939. He completed his BA with Gujarati and MA with Sanskrit in Mumbai and served as a lecturer in Gujarati at Zhunzhunwala College, Ghatkopar, Mumbai. He died at early age of 26 in Ahmedabad on 4 May 1966.

Works
He was experimentalist writer. He was associated with little magazine movement and modernist movement in Gujarati.

His collection Raneri (1968), edited by Jayant Parekh, was published posthumously. It includes geet, ghazal, metrical and non-metrical poetry as well as prose poetry. Darkness is recurring theme in his poetry. Suresh Dalal has called him "the poet of colour, rhythm and movement of darkness". He was modernist in his approach. Gandhijina Shishyo was his first work. His "Umbare Ubhi Sambharu Re Bol Valamna" is very popular song across Gujarat. This song depicts a rural woman waiting for and thus remembering her husband in her everyday deeds.

In 2018, Gujarati Vishwakosh Trust published his biography entitled Bol Valamna, written by Manilal H. Patel.

See also
 List of Gujarati-language writers

References

Further reading

External links
 Selected poems of Manilal Desai on Laystaro (in Gujarati)

Gujarati-language writers
Gujarati-language poets
Desai
1939 births
1966 deaths
20th-century Indian poets